Gaulois may refer to:

 French word for a person from Gaul
 Gaulois language
 Le Gaulois (1868–1929), a right-wing French newspaper
 French ship Gaulois
 French ship Gaulois (1812)
 French battleship Gaulois (1896–1916)

See also
 Gauloise (disambiguation)
 La Gauloise (disambiguation)